Paul F. Sanders (born c. 1927) is an American former politician in the state of Washington. He served the 48th district from 1976 to 1989.

References

Possibly living people
1920s births
Republican Party members of the Washington House of Representatives